Cory Ward (born April 20, 1974, in Mondovi, Wisconsin) is an American curler.

At the national level, he is a 1998 United States men's champion curler.

Teams

Personal life
Cory Ward started curling in 1982 at the age of 8.

He is married and has two children.

References

External links

Living people
1974 births
People from Mondovi, Wisconsin
American male curlers
American curling champions
Sportspeople from Wisconsin